= The Good Occupation =

History book

The Good Occupation: American Soldiers and the Hazards of Peace
- Author: Susan L. Carruthers
- Language: English
- Publication date: 2016
- Pages: 400

The Good Occupation: American Soldiers and the Hazards of Peace is a 2016 history book by Susan L. Carruthers, professor of history at Rutgers University. It deals with the occupations of Germany, Japan, Korea and Italy after World War II.
